Wang Anyu (born 3 February 1998), is a Chinese actor. He is best known for his roles in dramas Dreaming Back to the Qing Dynasty, Twenty Your Life On,  and The Heiress.

Career 
Wang graduated from the Communication University of China, majoring in Broadcasting & Hosting. 
In 2018, Wang participated in the music variety show The Coming One. He was then signed on to the agency Easy Plus Entertainment.

In 2019, Wang starred in the youth musical drama Our Shiny Days. This is his debut work. Wang then starred in historical romance drama Dreaming Back to the Qing Dynasty, portraying the role of Yinxiang.

In 2020, Wang starred in the coming-of-age drama Twenty Your Life On, and gained recognition for his role as a fencer. The same year, he starred in the historical drama The Heiress. He is set to star in the romance comedy drama Dt.Appledog's Time, the sequel to Go Go Squid!.

Filmography

Television series

Variety show

References 

1998 births
Male actors from Zhejiang
Living people
Chinese male television actors
21st-century Chinese male actors